David Hoey is a retired Irish hurler who played as a defender for the Clare senior team. At club level Hoey played with St Joseph's Doora-Barefield. Hoey won an All-Ireland Senior Club Hurling Championship with St Joseph's Doora-Barefield in 1999 when they defeated Rathnure by 2-14 to 0-8 in the final at Croke Park.

Hoey was part of the Clare team that reached the 2002 All-Ireland Final, starting at right half back in a 2-20 to 0-19 defeat to Kilkenny.

References

External links
Hurling Stats Profile

Living people
St Joseph's Doora-Barefield hurlers
Clare inter-county hurlers
Year of birth missing (living people)